Steven Cook (born December 10, 1984), known professionally as Steve Cook, is an American professional bodybuilder and two-time Mr. Olympia top ten finisher.

He is also known for his work on YouTube. In July 2020, his channel had 1.3 million subscribers.

Early life 

Cook was born on December 10, 1984. He was raised in Boise, Idaho, where his father worked as a high school athletic director. He grew up doing various sports, including wrestling.

Cook attended Dixie State University, now named Utah Tech University, where he was a linebacker for the NCAA Division II Dixie State Trailblazers football team. He completed his bachelor of science in Integrated Studies—biology/psychology.

Career 

After college, Cook worked as a waiter at Texas Roadhouse.

He got his start in professional bodybuilding at a Muscle & Fitness event during Mr. Olympia weekend in 2010. After winning the M&F Male Model Search, he soon became a bodybuilding.com and Optimum Nutrition spokesmodel.

He took part in the Gold's Classic Treasure Valley Natural Bodybuilding Championship, and won. He has won the Fit Body Competition, which Bodybuilding.com organizes. A year later in 2011, Cook also won the Naturally Bodybuilding Championship hosted by the NPC Iron Man magazine. He has a title from a NPC Junior National Championship.

Cook has won the IFBB Houston Pro twice, in 2012 and 2014.

Cook is a co-owner of the fitness app Fitness Culture and gym of the same name in St. George, Utah.

Cook was a coach on season 18 of The Biggest Loser on USA Network.

Competitive history 

 2010 ABFF 5th Annual Golds Classic Treasure Valley Natural Bodybuilding, Fitness, Figure, and Bikini Championships 1st
 2010 ABFF 5th Annual Golds Classic Treasure Valley Natural Bodybuilding, Fitness, Figure, and Bikini Championships 1st
 2010 Bodybuilding.com Fit Body Competition 1st
 2011 NPC Iron Man Magazine Naturally Bodybuilding, Figure and Bikini Championships 1st
 2011 NPC Junior USA Championships 3rd
 2011 NPC Junior National Championships 1st
 2012 IFBB Houston Pro 1st
 2013 IFBB Olympia Weekend 8th
 2014 IFBB Dallas Pro 1st
 2014 IFBB Olympia Weekend 5th

Personal life 
Cook got married at 21 and divorced at 23.

Cook was in a relationship with former Miss Bikini Olympia, Courtney King, until 2018.

In 2021, Cook proposed to fellow Gymshark athlete, Australian Morgan Rose-Maroney, after having been dating since late 2019. They have been married since May 2022.

See also 

 List of male professional bodybuilders

References

External links 

 Steve Cook on YouTube

Living people
American bodybuilders
Professional bodybuilders
1984 births
American YouTubers